Isaac Hawkins may refer to:
 Isaac Roberts Hawkins, a 19th-century member of the United States House of Representatives from Tennessee
 Issac Hawkins, an enslaved African American who was a subject of the 1838 Jesuit slave sale

See also 
 Isaac Hawkins Browne (disambiguation)
 John Isaac Hawkins